Ismaila "Ish" Jome (born November 4, 1994) is a Gambian footballer who currently is a free agent.

Career

Early life and youth career
Jome was born on November 4, 1994, in Banjul, Gambia, to Jainaba Jobe and Dodou Jome.  At a young age, he relocated and was raised in Brooklyn Center, Minnesota.  He attended high school at Prairie Seeds Academy, where he was named the 2012 Minnesota State High School Soccer Coaches Association's "Mr. Soccer" in his senior year.

Jome attended the University of California, Santa Barbara, and was a student-athlete for the UC Santa Barbara Gauchos men's soccer team.  He made an immediate impact in his first year where he played and started in 21 games, scored 2 goals, and added 7 assists.  He was named as the 2013 Big West Conference Freshman of the Year and to the conference's first team in addition to Soccer Americas All-Freshman team.  His sophomore campaign saw him appear in 18 more games, 17 of which he started, while adding a goal and 5 assists.  He was once again named First Team All-Big West Conference in 2014.  In 2015, Jome appeared in 16 games, starting 9, and scored 3 goals with 3 assists.  He left UCSB after his junior year to pursue a professional soccer career. While in college, Jome played for Ventura County Fusion of the Premier Development League in 2014 and 2015.  He also appeared for Portland Timbers U23s in 2015.

Minnesota United
Jome signed a professional contract with Minnesota United FC which was announced in March 2016.  He made his professional debut on July 23, 2016, as a 63rd-minute substitute against Fort Lauderdale Strikers and scored his first professional goal just seven minutes later in the 70th minute in a 3–1 victory for Minnesota.

Nashville SC

On May 22, 2018, Jome signed with USL side Nashville SC. On November 14, 2018, Nashville announced that they had not re-signed Jome for the 2019 season.

Portland Timbers
On April 2, 2021, Jome was signed to a one-year contract by Major League Soccer side Portland Timbers. Following the 2021 season, Portland opted to decline their contract option on Jome.

 Honors and awards 
 Individual UC Santa Barbara Gauchos All-Big West Conference First Team (2): 2013, 2014
 Big West Conference Freshman of the Year (1): 2013
 Soccer America All-Freshman First Team (1): 2013Prairie Seeds Academy'
 Minnesota State High School Soccer Coaches Association's "Mr. Soccer" (1): 2012

References

External links 
 
 Minnesota United player profile
 NASL player profile
 UC Santa Barbara player profile

1994 births
Living people
People from Banjul
Gambian footballers
Gambian expatriate footballers
Association football forwards
Association football defenders
Expatriate soccer players in the United States
UC Santa Barbara Gauchos men's soccer players
Ventura County Fusion players
Portland Timbers U23s players
Minnesota United FC (2010–2016) players
Minnesota United FC players
Nashville SC (2018–19) players
Colorado Springs Switchbacks FC players
Austin Bold FC players
Portland Timbers players
Portland Timbers 2 players
USL League Two players
North American Soccer League players
Major League Soccer players
People from Brooklyn Center, Minnesota
USL Championship players
MLS Next Pro players